The California Science and Engineering Fair, previously known as the California State Science Fair, is a science fair held annually at the California Science Center in Los Angeles, except 2020 when it was cancelled. It was established in 1952.

The fair is fed by 28 regional science fairs, each of which is allocated a number of projects based on prior history of producing winning entries.
The allocation in 2009 was 908 projects, an average of 24.7 projects per million population.

Awards are given in several categories at both junior (grades 6–8) and senior (grades 8–12) levels. The awards are posted shortly after the fair ends each spring. At the 2009 fair the major awards include the Patricia Beckman Project of the Year Award—David Zarrin of Redwood Middle School, Saratoga won the Junior Division ($5,000 award) and Anna K. Simpson of Patrick Henry Senior High School, San Diego won the Senior Division ($10,000). There are also many special awards sponsored by various organizations, some with cash prizes. An example of the special awards presented include the UCLA Brain Research Institute Award (given to Senior and Junior Divisions) that was recently awarded to Luke T. Anderson of De La Salle High School.

No fair was held in 2020 as officials cited the COVID-19 pandemic as grounds for cancellation. The 69th was deferred to 2021.

References

External links 
California Science and Engineering Fair
California State Science Fair: Affiliates

Annual fairs
Fairs in California
Annual events in Los Angeles County, California
Education in California
Science and technology in California
Science and technology in Greater Los Angeles